The Koso affair was a bribery scandal involving Isidor Koso, the head of the prime minister's office of the Slovak State. An illegal Jewish organization called the Working Group had been bribing Koso's wife, Žofia Kosova, by paying her son's tuition at a private school in Switzerland. Fleischmann and several other ÚŽ employees were arrested. Extremists in the Slovak government attacked those seen as soft on the Jews, and Koso was dismissed.

References
Citations

Bibliography
 

Bribery scandals
Political scandals in Slovakia
Crime in Slovakia
The Holocaust in Slovakia
1943 in Czechoslovakia
1943 in politics